Vogtia may refer to:
 1439 Vogtia, a minor planet
 Vogtia (cnidarian), a genus of cnidarians in the family Hippopodiidae
 Vogtia, a genus of moths in the family Pyralidae, synonym of Arcola